The VP70 is a 9×19mm, 18-round, double action only, semi-automatic/three-round burst capable polymer frame pistol manufactured by German arms firm Heckler & Koch GmbH. VP stands for Volkspistole (literally "People's Pistol"), and the designation 70 was for the first year of production, 1970.

Design 

The VP70 combined a number of design features that were innovative, or at least very unusual for its time:
 It was the first polymer-framed handgun, predating the Glock 17 by 12 years. At  unloaded, the weapon is lighter than most metal framed pistols of the time. 
 It has a double-stack, double-feed magazine; double-feed magazines are uncommon for pistols even today. These magazines hold 18 rounds, a rather high capacity for its original production time.
 As on the Mauser C96 and the Lahti L35, the stock was designed to be used as a holster when not mounted. On the military version of the VP70 this combination includes a unique feature: when mounted, a selective-fire switch, located on the stock, allows switching the weapon to a three-round-burst mode, with a 2,200 rounds per minute cyclic rate of fire. 
 The VP70 uses a spring-loaded striker like a Glock, instead of a conventional hammer.
 It is double-action only, so the trigger pull is relatively heavy.
 In lieu of a blade front sight, the VP70 uses a polished ramp with a central notch in the middle to provide the illusion of a dark front post.
 The barrel has very deeply cut rifling; this was done to purposely vent gas past the bullet, placing less gas pressure on the slide, a critical part of the VP70's direct blowback function. This also results in slightly reduced bullet velocity when compared to other pistols with similar, or even slightly shorter barrel length.

Variants 

The handgun comes in two varieties. The "M" (Militär, military) variant is selective-fire (semi-auto/three-round bursts), the "Z" (Zivil, civilian) variant is a semi-automatic-only version. The VP70Z has no provision to attach the stock, and also lacks the internal mechanical parts required for the burst-fire function even if the stock was attached. The VP70Z also has a crossbolt safety right behind the trigger; on the VP70M this is replaced with a non-functional plug, relying only on the heavy double-action trigger for safety.

Four hundred VP70Zs were made in 9×21mm IMI; these samples were made primarily for the civilian market of Italy, where the use of the 9×19mm Parabellum was at the time permitted only to military and law enforcement agencies. All of the VP70Z pistols sold to Italy had the provision to mount the stock, but still lacked the three-round-burst firing capability.

Users

 :Used by 1º Batalhão de Forças Especiais
 : Used during the Lebanese Civil War; adopted by some police forces
 
 : VP70Z variant.
 : VP70M variant.

References

External links

 HKPro.com: Heckler & Koch VP70
 Modern Firearms: Heckler und Koch VP 70
 H&K VP-70M: Polymer Framed Cutting Edge Machine Pistol from 1973
  

9×21mm IMI semi-automatic pistols
9mm Parabellum semi-automatic pistols
9mm Parabellum machine pistols
Machine pistols
Blowback-operated firearms
VP70
VP70
Weapons and ammunition introduced in 1970